Helium 3 (also written as Helium-3 and abbreviated as He3 or He-3) is an English record label. Formed by alternative rock band Muse in 2006, Helium 3 is a subdivision of Warner Music Group, one of the 'Big Three' record companies. Beginning with the single  "Supermassive Black Hole", the label has issued Muse releases since 2006, working internationally with Warner Records, A&E Records and the various regional Warner Music labels. The name of the record label is derived from Helium-3, a rare isotope of the noble gas helium which can theoretically be used in the future for energy production through nuclear fusion.

Discography
All Helium 3 releases are issued in the United Kingdom and Europe with A&E Records.
{|class="wikitable"
!Year
!Catalog no.
!Title
!Edition
!Co-labels
!Refs.
|-
|rowspan="11"|2006
|HEL3001
|rowspan="3"|"Supermassive Black Hole"
|7" vinyl
|Europe only
|align="center" rowspan="3"|
|-
|HEL3001CD
|CD single
|Europe only
|-
|HEL3001DVD
|DVD single
|United Kingdom only
|-
|HEL3002CD
|rowspan="2"|Black Holes and Revelations
|CD album
|WEA InternationalWarner Bros. Records
|align="center" rowspan="2"|
|-
|HEL3002CDX
|Digipak album
|Warner Bros. RecordsOdyssey Records
|-
|HEL3003
|rowspan="3"|"Starlight"
|7" vinyl
|United Kingdom only
|align="center" rowspan="3"|
|-
|HEL3003CD
|CD single
|Europe only
|-
|HEL3003DVD
|DVD single
|United Kingdom only
|-
|HEL3004
|rowspan="3"|"Knights of Cydonia"
|7" vinyl
|United Kingdom only
|align="center" rowspan="3"|
|-
|HEL3004CD
|CD single
|Europe only
|-
|HEL3004DVD
|DVD single
|United Kingdom only
|-
|rowspan="4"|2007
|HEL3005
|rowspan="3"|"Invincible"
|7" vinyl
|rowspan="3"|United Kingdom only
|align="center" rowspan="3"|
|-
|HEL3005CD
|CD single
|-
|HEL3005DVD
|DVD single
|-
|HEL3006
|"Map of the Problematique"
|Digital download
|United Kingdom only
|align="center"|
|-
|2008
|HEL3007
|HAARP
|CD+DVD
|WEA InternationalWarner Bros. Records
|align="center"|
|-
|2009
|825646874347
|The Resistance
|CD album
|Warner Bros. Records
|align="center"|
|-
|2012
|825646568802
|The 2nd Law
|CD album
|Warner Bros. Records
|align="center"|-
|-
|2013
|Unknown
|Live at Rome Olympic Stadium
|CD+DVD & CD+Blu-ray
|Warner Bros. Records
|align="center"|-
|-
|2015
|825646121250
|Drones
|CD album
|Warner Bros. Records
|align="center"|-
|-
|2018
|190295578855
|Simulation Theory
|CD album
|Warner Bros. Records
|align="center"|-
|-
|2022
|Unknown
|Will of the People
|CD album
|Warner Records
|align="center"|-
|}

Notes

 While digital download-only single "Map of the Problematique" was not assigned a catalog number, 'HEL3006' has not been used for any other purpose since; thus, it can be reasonably assumed to signify this release, as it was issued after "Invincible" (HEL3005) and before HAARP (HEL3007).

References

External links

Muse official website

Muse (band)
British record labels
Alternative rock record labels
Record labels established in 2006